Paul Colin may refer to:

Paul Colin (artist) (1892–1985), French poster artist
Paul Colin (journalist) (1895–1943), Belgian fascist journalist and editor
Paul Colin (writer) (1920–2018), French novelist